Cloonbonniffe, officially Cloonbonniff, is a small village and townland in County Roscommon, Ireland. The nearest town is Castlerea, about eight kilometres east.

Cloonbonniff is home to the O'Connor Don National School and community centre, which is beside Cloonbonniffe Catholic Church.

See also
 List of towns and villages in Ireland

References

Towns and villages in County Roscommon